Organic wine is wine made from grapes grown in accordance with the principles of organic farming, which excludes the use of artificial chemical fertilizers, pesticides, fungicides, and herbicides.

The consumption of organic wine grew at a rate of 3.7 percent over the year ending September 19, 2009, outpacing growth in the consumption of non-organic wine, which grew 2% during a similar period. There are an estimated 1,500–2,000 organic wine producers globally, including negociant labels, with more than 885 organic domains in France alone.

The legal definition of organic wine varies from country to country. The primary difference in how organic wine is defined relates to the use (or non-use) of preservatives, specifically sulfur (sulfur dioxide, sulfites, SO2), during the winemaking process.

In the US, no additional sulfites may be added to any organic product, including wine. In the EU, added sulfites are allowed in organic wine and determined by the kind of wine. Most other wine-producing countries do not have their own standards for organic wine and observe the standards of the nation importing the wine.

Another difference in the standards between the US and Europe is the additional label "Made with Organic Grapes." This label can be used in the US if the grapes used to make the wine are 100% certified organic, but the wine has added sulfites (up to 100 parts per million) or uses non-native yeasts. Europe does not have a comparable label.

Production and preservatives
Wine production comprises two main phases - which take place in the vineyard (i.e. grape growing) and in the winery (i.e. fermentation of the grapes into wine, bottling etc.). The baseline definition of organic wine as "wine made with grapes farmed organically" deals only with the first phase (grape growing). Numerous potential inputs can be made during the second phase of production to ferment and preserve the wine. The most universal wine preservative is sulfur dioxide. Therefore, the issue of wine preservation is central to the discussion of how organic wine is defined.

Wine matures over time, and it is widely considered that certain wines improve with aging as the flavors become more integrated and balanced. As a result, the greatest percentage of wines are produced in a way that allows them to last, sometimes as long as decades. The use of added sulfites is debated heavily within the organic winemaking community. Many vintners favor their use for the stabilization of wine, while others frown upon them. Currently, the only effective preservatives that allow wines to last for a long period are 'non-organic'. While there are a growing number of producers making wine without added preservatives, it is generally acknowledged that these wines are for consumption within a few years of bottling.

The various legal definitions of organic wine serve to address this challenge regarding the use of preservatives. In wine produced in the European Union, addition of sulfites, used as preservatives, is allowed in organic wine, but at lower maximum levels than in conventional wine production. It other countries the preservative is not allowed at all in organic wine. In the United States, wines certified "organic" under the National Organic Program cannot contain added sulfites, but wines labelled as “wine made from organic grapes" can.

In 2017, according to the survey "Le bio, c'est bon pour l'emploi" conducted by the UMR Moisa (Supagro Montpellier/Inra), an organic wine farm creates 1.5 times more jobs than a non-organic wine farm. Another finding is that jobs in this sector are more stable. 34.6% of organic farms employ one or more permanent employees against 21.6% in the case of non-certified farms. Similarly, 71.49% of employees are full-time, compared to 66.83% on non-organic farms.

Organic vs. conventional winegrowing
In the US, strict rules govern the organic winemaking process at all stages of production including harvesting, the types of yeast that can be used during fermentation as well as storage conditions. These rules are applied for all imported and domestic wines that acquire USDA certification. In the US, the total sulfite level must be less than 20 parts per million in order to receive organic certification. Organic certification in the UK is more simple as it is based upon the fact that the grapes are grown organically.

Organic certification 
Organic certification of wine is complex; different nations have different certification criteria. In the United States, the National Organic Program, run by the United States Department of Agriculture, sets standards for certification of organic foods, including organic wines.
In the United Kingdom, organic wine is defined as such made out of organic grapes.
Some wineries that are technically organic choose not to be certified for various reasons.

Organic certification does not necessarily mean that a winery or vineyard respects human rights and labor rights or ensures gender balance and racial diversity in operations. Labor rights issues have been documented, including in a 2016 film called 'Bitter Grapes' by a Danish filmmaker exposing exploitation of South African vineyard. https://www.washingtonpost.com/news/worldviews/wp/2016/10/31/a-documentary-raises-questions-about-slavery-in-south-africas-vineyards/

Organic certification also does not guarantee use of renewable energy, responsible water use, or more environmentally sustainable packaging.

Natural wine

Natural winemaking is a style  loosely defined as using native yeasts in the fermentation process and minimal or no sulfur dioxide in the winemaking process. It may also mean unfined and unfiltered as well. Natural winemaking is not governed by laws  in the U.S. and has no inspection or verification process unless it is a biodynamic wine. Estimates are that less than 10 percent of the organically grown wine in the United States is made in a natural winemaking style, most of which is certified biodynamic wine.

Natural winemakers may use organic or biodynamic grapes in their wines. Using native yeasts and relying on minimal manipulation often means that wines have a varying profile from year to year. Different vintages vary more than conventionally made wine because of the non-interventionist approach. This is a key part of the natural wine aesthetic which emphasizes the least amount of intervention.

The natural wine movement has grown in popularity in part as a backlash against the Parkerization of wine,  in which a small number of critics' palates and the points system has come to define the market value of wines. The effect of this on wine producers has been to try to manipulate the taste of their wine (for example trying to increase the intensity of fruit and oak) in order to please certain wine critics and get higher ratings. As a result, critics of these critics say this is causing an increasing uniformity amongst wines and a loss of regional and varietal character. The natural wine movement is one response to the global commodification of winemaking.

"Natural" wine should not be confused with “clean wine” which has no definition, scientific standards, certification system, or audits.

Sustainable wines
Some farmers take additional steps beyond standard organic winemaking to apply sustainable farming practices. Examples include the use of composting and the cultivation of plants that attract insects that are beneficial to the health of the vines. Sustainable practices in these vineyards can also extend to actions that have seemingly little or nothing to do with the production of grapes such as providing areas for wildlife to prevent animals from eating the grapes and allowing weeds and wildflowers to grow between the vines. Sustainable farmers may use bio-diesel for tractors in the vineyards to reduce emissions among the vines, or plough with horses.

Sustainable winemaking is a systems perspective of integration of the natural and human resources, involving environmental health, economic profitability, and social and economic equity. These are embodied in the Code of Sustainable Winegrowing Practices Workbook published by the California Sustainable Winegrowing Alliance (CSWA).

Key overall issues that come up in sustainable wine include social concerns such as worker income, health, conditions, diversity, and gender equality. Environmental issues covered by sustainable wine range from wildlife habitat, pest management, to soil health. The question of composting in vineyards spans both soil health and 'zero waste'. Responsible water use in sustainable wine addresses both minimizing water use through techniques such as drip agriculture to wastewater management, particularly in vineyards that use chemicals and are not organic. Sustainability in the field has also come to encompass packaging to minimize the weight of bottles, maximize use of recycled glass in bottles, and explore more environmentally friendly packaging such as boxes. Renewable energy, energy efficiency, and improvements in infrastructure such as capturing and recycling CO2 from alcoholic fermentation also play a role in sustainable wine.

See also

Organic movement
Biodynamic wine

References

External links
Sustainable wine news
Organic wine news

Wine
Wine